Wild About Harry! is a studio album by the American trumpeter Harry James with The Harry James Orchestra. The album was recorded in May 1957 and released by Capitol Records on stereo LP (ST-874), mono LP (T-874), and a series of three EPs (EAP 1-874, EAP 2-874 and EAP 3-874).

After coasting through the mid-1950s, James made a complete re-evaluation of where he was heading in his musical career. Count Basie provided the impetus by making a significant comeback with his newly formed "16 Men Swinging" band, and James wanted a band with a decided Basie flavor. This album is the first of three released on Capitol Records representative of the Basie style that James adopted during this period, with some of the arrangements provided by the former Basie saxophonist and arranger Ernie Wilkins, whom James hired for his own band.

By the time of the scheduled recording of the album in May 1957, the drummer, Buddy Rich, had long since left James's band, but knowing Rich's admiration for Basie's music, James asked Rich to play on the album. Rich was billed as "Buddy Poor" since he was still under contract to Verve Records. James was so pleased by the results from the first day of recording that he wore the same black-and-white striped shirt on the other sessions for the album.

Track listing

Personnel
Leader, trumpet, liner notes – Harry James
Saxophone – Willie Smith, Corky Corcoran, Ernest Small, Francis Polifroni, Herb Lorden
Trumpet – Robert Rolfe, Don Paladino, Nick Buono, Ray Linn
Trombone – Robert Edmondson, Herb Harper, Robert Robinson
Piano – Larry Kinnamon
Guitar – Allan Reuss
Double bass – Russ Phillips
Drums - Buddy Poor (pseudonym for Buddy Rich)

References

Jazz albums by American artists
1957 albums
Capitol Records albums
Albums arranged by Ernie Wilkins
Big band albums